RGI may refer to:

Railway Gazette International, a monthly business journal
Royal Glasgow Institute of the Fine Arts, art gallery in Glasgow, Scotland
Rio Grande Industries, a railroad holding company name.
Recommended for General Interchange, in the Unicode support of emojis.